Bienvenido Fabian (March 20, 1920 in San Pedro de Macorís, Dominican Republic – November 23, 2000 in Santo Domingo, Dominican Republic) was a composer from the Dominican Republic during the era of the dictator Rafael Trujillo.

Don Fabian composed famous ballads and Afro-Cuban music such as "Dos Alma" and "Tuya, Y Mas Que Tuya" made famous by the combo orchestra La Sonora Matancera and Celia Cruz throughout the 1950s and 1970s.  Many compare the collaboration of the group La Sonora Matancera & Celia Cruz with Fabian to the likes of the Duke Ellington Orchestra.

Discography

Fabian's compositions appear in albums such as

Isidoro Flores y su conjunto - La Sabrosona (1960)

Boogaloo Combo - Com Muito Ritmo (1972)

La Sonora Matancera

Songs composed by Fabian

Goza Negra
Mi noche fatal
Besarte,
Di que no,
Lo que te pido,
Condena,
De que color son tus ojos,
Quien si no tú,
Al fin te fuiste

Sources
Biblioteca Nacional de Espana

References

1920 births
2000 deaths
20th-century composers
Dominican Republic composers
People from San Pedro de Macorís